An automobile roof or car top is the portion of an automobile that sits above the passenger compartment, protecting the vehicle occupants from sun, wind, rain, and other external elements. Because the earliest automobiles were designed in an era of horse-drawn carriages, early automobile roofs used similar materials and designs.

Variations
In later years, many variations on the automobile roof developed. These include:

 Convertible roofs
 Roof modules
 Roof modules
 Hardtops
 Sunroofs
 T-tops
 Targa tops
 Vinyl roofs

See also
 Car glass
 Roof rack
 Roof

References

Auto parts